Margaret M. Jacoby Observatory is an astronomical observatory owned and operated by the Community College of Rhode Island. It opened in 1978 and is located in Warwick, Rhode Island, United States. The Observatory was renamed in 1995 to honor Prof. Margaret M. Jacoby, the founder of the CCRI physics department, who secured the funding for the construction of the Observatory. The original 14" aperture telescope was replaced with a 16" Schmidt-Cassegrain telescope in 2009.

See also
 List of observatories

References

External links
Warwick Clear Sky Chart Forecasts of observing conditions covering Jacoby Observatory.

Astronomical observatories in Rhode Island
Buildings and structures in Warwick, Rhode Island
Community College of Rhode Island
Education in Kent County, Rhode Island
Tourist attractions in Kent County, Rhode Island